The 2012–13 season was the 89th season in the existence of AEK Athens F.C. and the 54th consecutive season in the top flight of Greek football. They competed in the Super League and the Greek Cup. The season began on 25 August 2012 and finished on 21 April 2013.

Events
 26 June: AEK legend Thomas Mavros takes over club's management in an effort to save the club from financial disaster
26 June: Former AEK player Vangelis Vlachos is assigned as the new manager
1 July: Many players including Pantelis Kafes, Fabian Vargas, Eiður Guðjohnsen, Nikos Georgeas agree to have their contracts terminated in need to pay off debts .
1 July: Greek-Belgian starlet Viktor Klonaridis signs for Lille for a reported fee of €800,000.
9 July: Defensive Midfielder Grigoris Makos signs for 1860 Munich for a reported fee of €465,000.
30 September: Vangelis Vlachos and AEK Athens part ways.
10 October: Ewald Lienen is assigned as the new manager
9 April: Ewald Lienen and AEK Athens part ways.
9 April: AEK Athens announces the agreement with coach Traianos Dellas until the end of season, with Vasilis Borbokis and Akis Zikos as assistant coaches

Players

Squad information

NOTE: The players are the ones that have been announced by the AEK Athens' press release. No edits should be made unless a player arrival or exit is announced. Updated 30 June 2013, 23:59 UTC+3.

Transfers

In

Summer

Winter

Out

Summer

Notes

 a.  plus 10% of resale fee.

Winter

Loan in

Winter

Loan out

Summer

Winter

 a.  plus 50% of resale.
 b.  Makos also gave up to the club's debt on him which was €165,000.

Renewals

Overall transfer activity

Spending
Summer:  €415,000

Winter:  €50,000

Total:  €465,000

Income
Summer:  €1,950,000

Winter:  €0

Total:  €1,950,000

Expenditure
Summer:  €1,535,000

Winter:  €50,000

Total:  €1,485,000

Club

Management

Kit

|

|

|

Other information

Pre-season and friendlies

Super League Greece

League table

Results summary

Results by Matchday

Fixtures

Greek Cup

Round of 32

Statistics

Squad statistics

! colspan="11" style="background:#FFDE00; text-align:center" | Goalkeepers
|-

! colspan="11" style="background:#FFDE00; color:black; text-align:center;"| Defenders
|-

! colspan="11" style="background:#FFDE00; color:black; text-align:center;"| Midfielders
|-

! colspan="11" style="background:#FFDE00; color:black; text-align:center;"| Forwards
|-

! colspan="11" style="background:#FFDE00; color:black; text-align:center;"| Left during Winter Transfer Window
|-

|-
|}

Disciplinary record

|-
! colspan="14" style="background:#FFDE00; text-align:center" | Goalkeepers

|-
! colspan="14" style="background:#FFDE00; color:black; text-align:center;"| Defenders

|-
! colspan="14" style="background:#FFDE00; color:black; text-align:center;"| Midfielders

|-
! colspan="14" style="background:#FFDE00; color:black; text-align:center;"| Forwards

|-
! colspan="14" style="background:#FFDE00; color:black; text-align:center;"| Left during Winter Transfer window

|-
|}

Starting 11

Goalscorers

References

External links
AEK Athens F.C. Official Website
Super League Team Profile

2012-13
Greek football clubs 2012–13 season